The Trabzonspor football club's 2001–02 season was its 27th consecutive season in Turkey's Süper Lig.

Season summary 

Trabzonspor finished in 14th place, only three points above the relegation level, the club's the worst-ever rank in the league. The club's −11 goal average was also the worst goal average for the club during its time in Süper Lig.

Squad

Transfers

In

Out

League table

Scorers

Süper Lig games

First half

Second half

Turkish Cup games

European Cup games 

Trabzonspor did not qualify to play in any European Cup games during the 2001–02 season.

See also 
 2001–02 Süper Lig

Notes

Sources 
 Turkish Football Federation 
 Trabzonspor Official Site
 MAÇKOLİK

Trabzonspor seasons
Turkish football clubs 2001–02 season